In the United States, the state police is a police body unique to each U.S. state, having statewide authority to conduct law enforcement activities and criminal investigations. In general, state police officers or highway patrol officers, known as state troopers, perform functions that do not fall within the jurisdiction of the county sheriff (Vermont being a notable exception), such as enforcing traffic laws on state highways and interstate expressways, overseeing the security of the state capitol complex, protecting the governor, training new officers for local police forces too small to operate an academy and providing technological and scientific services. They support local police and help to coordinate multi-jurisdictional task force activity in serious or complicated cases in those states that grant full police powers statewide.

A general trend has been to bring all of these agencies under a state-level Department of Public Safety. Additionally, they may serve under different state departments, such as the Highway Patrol under the state Department of Transportation and the marine patrol under the Department of Natural Resources. Twenty-three U.S. states use the term "State Police." Forty-nine states have a State Police agency or its equivalent, with Hawaii being the only state with a Sheriff Division of the Hawaii Department of Public Safety with statewide jurisdiction.

History
The Texas Rangers are the earliest form of state law enforcement in the United States, first organized by Stephen F. Austin in 1823. The original ranger force consisted of ten men charged with protecting settlers from Native American attacks. Though the rangers of this era are today considered law enforcement officers, they rarely wore badges and were little more than volunteers; the Mexican military was officially in charge of law enforcement in the then-Mexican state of Coahuila y Tejas. The Rangers later served as a paramilitary force on the U.S.-Mexico border and in several armed military conflicts, including the Texas Revolution, the Mexican–American War, and the American Civil War. They continued to fill basic law enforcement and frontier protection roles until the close of the "wild west" era. In the early 1900s, they transformed into a criminal investigative agency. The history and legacy of the Texas Rangers has spawned numerous depictions in popular culture. The colloquial image of a Texas Ranger "always [getting] their man" has likewise made the Rangers a revered and highly competitive agency within law enforcement, with fewer than 1 in 100 applicants being considered for a single position.

The Pennsylvania State Police force emerged in the aftermath of the anthracite mine strike of 1902, in Pennsylvania. The passage of legislation on May 2, 1905, did not provoke controversy because it was quietly rushed through the mine-owner dominated legislature, but the strike-breaking role of the new police elicited strong opposition from organized labor, who likened them to the repressive Russian cossacks under the tsar. President Theodore Roosevelt, himself a former President of the New York City Police Commission, noted that the Pennsylvania State Police were intended to replace the "infamous" Coal and Iron Police, the private company police used to counter union attacks on private property:

Roosevelt's assertions notwithstanding, the Iron and Coal Police continued to operate in increasing numbers into the 1930s.

The formation of the New York State Police force on April 11, 1917, was done amidst controversy and public debate, and the legislation creating it passed by only one vote. Proponents of a proposal to establish the New York State Police depicted state police as the policemen-soldiers of an impartial state in labor disputes, and saw in them "no gendarmerie of France, no carabinieri of Italy, intimating that labor's opposition was "un-American". Instead, they were to be more like the trooper police of Australia, both of which had a much more respectable reputation than the maligned forces evoked by trade unionists. Outside of Pennsylvania, the new state police were also established to free up the National Guard from strikebreaking duties, which was extensive in the later 19th century and early decades of the 20th.

The strikebreaking demands on the New York state police decreased over time and their mandate modernized with the creation of the inter-state highway system and proliferation of the automobile. While the early "state troopers", as the name implies, were mounted troops, by mid-century they were fully motorized police forces..

The WVSP was also used very heavily during the prohibition era for hunting down and destroying moonshine stills/operations throughout the mountainous and rural areas of West Virginia, which resulted in some deaths of WVSP Troopers. WVSP is the 4th oldest State Police agency in the United States of America. Governor John Jacob Cornwell was insistent upon having a State Police force which he said, "was mandatory in order for him to uphold the laws of our state." Part of the compromise was the name of the organization: "West Virginia Department of Public Safety" was the official name until 1995 when the name was changed to "West Virginia State Police" during the legislative session.

The federal government in the 1920s was generally distrustful of southern states establishing state police, fearing the agencies would be used to oppress black citizens from voting and exercising their civil rights. Additionally, southern states were non-union and had little need for such state police, as did some northern mining states. During this time the Ku Klux Klan (KKK) was also on a resurgence. In response, the southern states established agencies to regulate the increasing problems related to motor vehicles and highway safety, such as licensure compliance, vehicle registration, speed enforcement, vehicular equipment safety, vehicle insurance laws and drunken driving. Over time, these agencies were vested with general police powers, but remained focused primarily on highway and vehicular law enforcement.

North Carolina for example established a DMV motor vehicle theft investigations unit in 1921 to combat a rising problem with car theft, but the state realized a need for a larger, uniformed highway patrol agency to solely enforce traffic laws statewide. Local NC sheriffs did not have the personnel, resources or training to do so during that era, but did not want their powers usurped by a per-se state police agency. Thus, the NC State Highway Patrol was established on July 1, 1929. Its original command staff was sent to the Pennsylvania State Police Academy for training. Upon completion, these lieutenants and a captain returned to NC and started the SHP with a training camp for new recruits at Camp Glenn, a WW1 abandoned army post in Morehead City. Chartered to enforce traffic laws only, in the early 1930s the NCSHP had added in its charter that it had powers to deal with among other crimes, bank robbery. This was done at the request of the federal government, so that local states could assist the FBI during the rash of bank robberies in the gangster era of the Great Depression in the 1930s. During this time, the FBI issued 100 spare Thompson .45 caliber sub-machineguns to the NCSHP, to prepare NC troopers to help the FBI combat the rash epidemic of bank robberies at the time. The expected scores of bank robberies never occurred in NC, instead being an epidemic confined to the sparsely-populated and vast areas of the Southwest, Midwest and Great Plains states from Texas to Minnesota. The guns were kept in the main SHP armory in Raleigh and never issued. The weapons were returned to the Federal government in the mid-1980s.

In 1919 Virginia established a motor vehicle enforcement agency and it was established as state police in 1932. Kentucky established a highway patrol in 1935 and it was established as state police in 1948, but these states, located on the border of the previous Civil War south, were more under the watchful eye of the federal government than were deeper southern states. The only deep south, former Confederate State to have a true state police agency is Louisiana. The Louisiana State Police also first started out as a highway patrol agency but in 1936 it was established as a state police, at the desire and influence of the late Governor Huey Long, who used the troopers as a powerful body guard force. Long is often called one of the most powerful Democratic politicians in US history.

Types of state police agencies
In many states, the state police are known by different names: the various terms used are "State Police", "Highway Patrol", "State Highway Patrol", "State Patrol", and "State Troopers". However, the jurisdictions and functions of these agencies are usually the same, regardless of title. Some agencies' names are actually misnomers with respect to the work regularly done by their members. All but two state police entities use the term "trooper" to refer to their commissioned members; California and New Mexico are the lone exceptions, using the term "officer" instead. New Mexico has commissioned and certified volunteer State Troopers in the New Mexico Mounted Patrol, a self-governing state agency, separate from the New Mexico State Police. (Until 2015, Arizona also used "officer", but has since switched to "trooper".) These titles are usually historical and do not necessarily describe the agency's function or jurisdiction. Colloquial or slang terms for a state trooper may include "troop," "statey," "stater," or—in trucker slang—"Smokey", "full-grown bear", or "Polar Bear" if the police vehicle is all white. Some regional slang terms also exist for specific agencies.

Alaska and Arkansas are the only states with both a highway patrol and a state police. The Alaska Highway Patrol is a bureau of the Alaska State Troopers while the Arkansas Highway Patrol is the uniformed patrol division of the Arkansas State Police. A separate Arkansas Highway Police exists as part of the Arkansas Department of Transportation but exists as a work-zone and commercial vehicle enforcement agency. The New Hampshire Highway Patrol, also a commercial vehicle enforcement agency, has since been merged into the New Hampshire State Police as Troop G - Commercial Vehicle Enforcement.

The California State Police (CSP) was a division of the California Department of General Services, and was a security police agency which merged with the California Highway Patrol in 1995; following this, the California Highway Patrol assumed security police responsibilities in addition to its highway patrol duties.

Pennsylvania formed a State Highway Patrol in 1923 within the Department of Highways to enforce the vehicle laws of Pennsylvania's burgeoning highway system. The State Highway Patrol was merged with the State Police on June 29, 1937.

The Texas State Police was formed during the administration of Texas Governor Edmund J. Davis on July 22, 1870, to combat crime associated with Reconstruction statewide in Texas. It worked primarily against racially based crimes, and included black police officers, which caused howls of protest from former slave owners (and future segregationists). It was dissolved by order of the legislature on April 22, 1873. The Texas Highway Patrol currently performs statewide police functions.

State police

Though many forces use the term "state police," its meaning is not consistent from agency to agency. In many places, it is a full-service law enforcement agency which responds to calls for service, investigates criminal activity, and regularly patrols high-crime areas. On the other hand, some state police agencies, despite the name, are strictly tasked with traffic enforcement, though their members usually retain full police powers; the Arkansas State Police is an example.

States with state police

 Alaska
 Arkansas
 Connecticut
 Delaware
 Idaho
 Illinois
 Indiana
 Kentucky
 Louisiana
 Maine
 Maryland
 Massachusetts
 Michigan
 New Hampshire
 New Jersey
 New Mexico
 New York
 Nevada
 Oregon
 Pennsylvania
 Rhode Island
 Texas
 Vermont
 Virginia
 West Virginia

Highway patrol and highway police

Several agencies use the term "highway patrol," though this name can be misleading in some cases. Some highway patrol agencies are, as their name implies, dedicated to enforcing state traffic laws on the highways; a few are full-service state police agencies which regularly respond to calls and conduct inner-city policing functions; and yet others are a bridge, focusing primarily on traffic enforcement but providing general policing services when and where necessary. Their primary concern is enforcing motor vehicle laws, but they also assist with other incidents. These include riots, prison disturbances, labor related disturbances, and providing security at sporting events.

States with highway patrol

 Alabama
 Arizona
 Arkansas
 California
 Florida
 Kansas
 Mississippi
 Montana
 North Dakota
 Oklahoma
 South Carolina
 South Dakota
 Tennessee
 Texas
 Utah
 Wyoming

States with state highway patrol
 Missouri
 North Carolina
 Ohio

States with state patrol

 Colorado
 Georgia
 Minnesota
 Nebraska
 Iowa
 Washington
 Wisconsin

States with highway police
 Highway Police (Dept. of Transportation) in Arkansas.

Statewide policing in Hawaii

Unlike the other 49 states and territories, Hawaii is not a contiguous area of land, but rather an archipelago, consisting primarily of eight major islands. Because of its geography, it is impossible to use roads to get from one local/municipal jurisdiction to another. As a consequence, Hawaii is the only state that does not have a specifically named state police/highway patrol force. Highway patrol functions are instead carried out within each of the state's five counties, which are served by four police forces (Kalawao County is administered as part of Maui County):
Hawai‘i County Police Department
Honolulu Police Department
Kauai County Police Department
Maui County Police Department

The Department of the Attorney General includes an Investigations Division which assists the department’s civil, criminal, and administrative cases.

The Sheriff Division of the Hawaii Department of Public Safety performs the security policing tasks usually undertaken by a dedicated state police force or Capitol police agency, such as airport security, counter-narcotics, counter-terrorism, executive protection and other specialized duties since the September 2001 terrorist attacks, in addition to providing bailiffs and corrections officers to the judicial apparatus.

The television series Hawaii Five-O featured a fictional state police detective unit in Hawaii. This was not a uniformed police force, but instead functioned more as a state bureau of investigation.

Territorial police
Three of the five permanently inhabited territories of the United States have a police department with territory-wide authority: 
 Guam Police Department
 Puerto Rico Police Department
 U.S. Virgin Islands Police Department
 American Samoa Police Department
 North Mariana Island Police Department

List of state police agencies

Agencies without comment are independent agencies.
 Alabama Highway Patrol a division of the Alabama Department of Public Safety
 Alaska State Troopers a division of the Alaska Department of Public Safety
 Arizona Highway Patrol a division of the Arizona Department of Public Safety
 Arkansas State Police which is a division within the Arkansas Department of Public Safety
 Arkansas Highway Police which is a division within the Arkansas Department of Transportation
 California Highway Patrol a department within the California State Transportation Agency
 Colorado State Patrol a division of the Colorado Department of Public Safety
 Connecticut State Police a division of the Connecticut Department of Emergency Services and Public Protection
 Delaware State Police a division of the Delaware Department of Public Safety and Homeland Security
 Florida Highway Patrol a division of the Florida Department of Highway Safety and Motor Vehicles
 Georgia State Patrol a division of the Georgia Department of Public Safety
 Hawaii State Sheriff's Department a division of the Hawaii Department of Public Safety
 Idaho State Police 
 Illinois State Police
 Indiana State Police
 Iowa State Patrol a division of the Iowa Department of Public Safety
 Kansas Highway Patrol
 Kentucky State Police a division of the Kentucky Justice and Public Safety Cabinet
 Louisiana State Police a division of the Louisiana Department of Public Safety
 Maine State Police a division of the Maine Department of Public Safety
 Maryland State Police
 Massachusetts State Police an agency of the Commonwealth of Massachusetts' Executive Office of Public Safety and Security
 Michigan State Police
 Minnesota State Patrol a division of the Minnesota Department of Public Safety
 Mississippi Highway Patrol a division of the Mississippi Department of Public Safety
 Missouri State Highway Patrol is a division of the Missouri Department of Public Safety
 Montana Highway Patrol a division of the Montana Department of Justice
 Nebraska State Patrol 
 Nevada State Police a division of the Nevada Department of Public Safety 
 New Hampshire State Police a division of the New Hampshire Department of Safety
 New Jersey State Police a division of the New Jersey Department of Law and Public Safety
 New Mexico State Police a division of the New Mexico Department of Public Safety 
 New York State Police
 North Carolina State Highway Patrol a division of the North Carolina Department of Public Safety; also North Carolina State Bureau of Investigation
 North Dakota Highway Patrol
 Ohio State Highway Patrol a division of the Ohio Department of Public Safety
 The OSHP also maintains a force of State of Ohio Police Officers mostly located in the Columbus, Ohio area, who provide security police services.
 Oklahoma Highway Patrol a division of the Oklahoma Department of Public Safety
 Oregon State Police
 Pennsylvania State Police
 Rhode Island State Police a division of the Rhode Island Department of Public Safety
 South Carolina Highway Patrol a division of the South Carolina Department of Public Safety
 South Dakota Highway Patrol a division of the South Dakota Department of Public Safety
 Tennessee Highway Patrol a division of the Tennessee Department of Safety
 Texas Highway Patrol a division of the Texas Department of Public Safety
 Utah Highway Patrol a division of the Utah Department of Public Safety
 Vermont State Police a division of the Vermont Department of Public Safety
 Virginia State Police an agency within the Cabinet Secretariat of Public Safety,
 Washington State Patrol a independent division 
 West Virginia State Police a division of the West Virginia Department of Military Affairs and Public Safety
 Wisconsin State Patrol a division of the Wisconsin Department of Transportation
 Wyoming Highway Patrol a division of the Wyoming Department of Transportation

Other state police agencies
State Bureau of Investigation (SBI): the state's equivalent to the Federal Bureau of Investigation.
 State Bureau of Narcotics: the state-level counterpart to the U.S Drug Enforcement Administration.  
 Department of Public Safety (DPS) exist in 31 states (Alabama, Alaska, Arizona, Arkansas, Colorado, Connecticut, Delaware, Georgia, Hawaii, Iowa, Kentucky, Louisiana, Maine, Maryland, Massachusetts, Minnesota, Mississippi, Missouri, New Hampshire, New Jersey, New Mexico, Nevada, North Carolina, Ohio, Oklahoma, Rhode Island, South Carolina, South Dakota, Tennessee, Texas, Utah, and Vermont) and the territory of Puerto Rico; often these are umbrella organizations which provide oversight and coordination over various state or territory-level police agencies, such as State Police, State Bureau of Investigation, or Highway Patrols.
 State Sheriff:
 Hawaii, where the State of Hawaii Sheriff's Office, part of the Hawaii Department of Public Safety, serves as the statewide law enforcement agency.
 Rhode Island, the Rhode Island State Sheriff's Department is assigned to various job functions within Rhode Island's four County Court facilities (Providence County, Kent County, Newport County and Washington County). The functions of the State Sheriff's Department include Courtroom/Judicial Security, Court Facility and Cellblock Operation, Inmate Transportation, Interstate Extraditions, Interstate Inmate Transfers, Writ Service and Body Attachments.
 State Marshal (Connecticut): The functions of the State Marshals Office include Courtroom/Judicial Security (bailiffs), Court Facility and Cellblock Operation, Inmate Transportation, Interstate Extraditions, Interstate Inmate Transfers, Writ Service and Body Attachments.
 Motor Carrier Enforcement: another organization with many various titles and may be part of the actual State Police or Highway Patrol. Many belong their state's Department of Transportation or even the Secretary of State. These agencies conduct vehicle inspections and enforce the Federal Motor Carrier Safety Assistance Program (MCSAP) as mandated by the Federal Motor Carrier Safety Administration (FMCSA). They conduct safety inspections of commercial motor vehicles (primarily trucks and buses), inspects highway shipments of hazardous materials, and performs compliance reviews (safety performance audits) on motor carriers. The DPS adopts and enforces driver and vehicle safety regulations and hazardous materials regulations as part of this program. Both the Arkansas Highway Police and the New Hampshire Highway Patrols are motor carrier enforcement agencies.
 Marine Patrol: The state water police.
 State Capitol Police: Protect state capitols and government buildings.  Currently utilized in Connecticut, Delaware, Florida, Georgia, Maryland, Mississippi, Nevada, North Carolina.
Game Wardens: Charged to enforce state hunting, and fishing laws. Most Game Wardens can also enforce all state laws (traffic, drugs, etc.). In some state, they can be the enforcement arm of an agency or a division of an umbrella law enforcement agency.  Examples: Alaska Wildlife Troopers, California Department of Fish and Wildlife, Colorado Parks and Wildlife.
 State Park Police: California State Park Rangers, Maryland, New Jersey, New York. Florida Park Police.
 Colorado Rangers: Colorado is currently the only state with a statewide shared reserve that commissions fully authorized peace officers as force multipliers to other agencies throughout the state. 
 Florida Department of Law Enforcement: In 1967, the Florida Legislature merged the responsibilities of several state criminal justice organizations to create the Bureau of Law Enforcement. The Bureau began with 94 positions, headed by a Commissioner who reported to the Governor, certain Cabinet members, two Sheriffs, and one Chief of Police. In July 1969, after government restructuring, the Bureau became the Florida Department of Law Enforcement (FDLE).
 Illinois Secretary of State Police: The Illinois Secretary of State Police monitors amongst other things handicap parking violations.

See also
Highway patrol
 State bureau of investigation
Police uniforms of the United States
List of U.S. state and local law enforcement agencies

Further reading

 Musgrave, P. (2020). Bringing the State Police In: The Diffusion of U.S. Statewide Policing Agencies, 1905–1941. Studies in American Political Development.

References

External links

 PoliceLink.com
 State Trooper Directory
 State Law Enforcement Directory

State law enforcement agencies of the United States